Actinopus cochabamba is a species of mygalomorph spiders in the family Actinopodidae. It is found in Bolivia.

References

cochabamba
Spiders described in 2016
Spiders of South America
Fauna of Bolivia